William John Lowrie (3 January 1893 – 16 November 1938) was an Australian rules footballer who played with St Kilda in the Victorian Football League (VFL).

Notes

External links 

1893 births
1938 deaths
Australian rules footballers from Victoria (Australia)
St Kilda Football Club players